Deh-e Qazi-ye Yek (also Romanized as Deh-e Qāẕī-ye Yek; also known as Deh-e Kāfī and Deh-e Qāẕī) is a village in Madvarat Rural District, in the Central District of Shahr-e Babak County, Kerman Province, Iran. At the 2006 census, its population was 32, in 7 families.

References 

Populated places in Shahr-e Babak County